The broadcasting rights for the 2014 FIFA World Cup were sold directly by FIFA, or through licensed companies or organizations such as the European Broadcasting Union, Organización de Televisión Iberoamericana, African Union of Broadcasting, International Media Content, Inter-Sports Marketing, M-League, Dentsu, RS International Broadcasting & Sports Management and MP & Silva. Airlines companies such as Etihad Airways had in-flight live telecasts of all 64 matches.

Several territories and countries (for example, India, Italy, Algeria, Korea Republic) are grouped as they share common broadcasters, and sometimes, common geographic space.

Television

Radio

Notes

 - Alongside TeleAruba - Alongside CVM Television. - Alongside STVS. - Alongside One Caribbean Media. - Alongside ABC and ESPN. - FT only covered the tournament in the French overseas territories - Each country also received coverage of the event by a domestic broadcaster. - Nigeria did not receive coverage from Canal+. - Alongside SportsMax. Also, not covered by Univision.

References

Broadcasting rights
FIFA World Cup broadcasting rights